Survivor South Africa: Immunity Island is the eighth season of the South African reality competition show, Survivor South Africa. Before the arrival of the COVID-19 pandemic in South Africa, this would have been the first time in the show's history that a third season ordered by M-Net would have aired in back-to-back years. Originally shelved due to budget and broadcast scheduling after the end of the seventh season, the show's social media announced a Season 8 audition call on 8 December 2019. Applications were open from then until the 20th of January 2020, with the season airing in the second half of 2020. Immunity Island was the sixth season hosted by Nico Panagio and was produced by Afrokaans Film & Television.

Production was initially set to take place from March to May 2020; however, M-Net and Afrokaans had to reassess the season's location and timeline for filming due to the COVID-19 pandemic potentially putting the production and full cast at risk of exposure. Series director Leroux Botha assured fans that Afrokaans were making a plan to navigate the pandemic. On the 16th of April 2020, M-Net announced that the season would be postponed indefinitely as a result of the global measures in preventing the spread of the COVID-19 pandemic. To ensure the safety of the film production, crew and contestants that had been cast, M-Net felt the need to halt production before it began. On December 17, Afrokaans and M-Net announced that they managed to finish filming a season locally in South Africa, with a following announcement on December 20 that the season was filmed in the Wild Coast region of the Eastern Cape, with a premiere date set for 3 June 2021. The season concluded with a pre-recorded finale and reunion which aired on September 16, 2021, when Nicole Wilmans was crowned Sole Survivor over Anela Majozi by a vote of 8–1.

Immunity Island
This season introduced Immunity Island, similar to the titular Island of Secrets in the previous season. The winners of the immunity challenge would select one castaway to be exiled on Immunity Island, granting that person the immunity island necklace for the upcoming Tribal Council. The exiled castaway would then be given two options:
 Stay and Play: In which the exiled player would participate in a solo challenge for an advantage offered. Succeeding in the challenge would award the player with the advantage while failing would give the player a disadvantage in the game. Additionally, while the exiled player is immune from elimination (by virtue of the Immunity Island Necklace), they are not able to vote in that night's Tribal Council. They returned to the tribe during the Tribal Council.
 Give Up and Go: In which the exiled player would immediately return to their tribe. While they can participate in the Tribal Council (being able to strategise with their tribe before the council and cast a vote), they may not hold the Island Necklace at the Tribal Council. However, they do have the option of bequeathing their immunity island necklace to one of their tribemates at the Tribal Council, making their selection immune.

Contestants
The cast is composed of 20 players divided into two tribes, Vuna and Zamba, based on a random draw. Day 7 saw the tribes partake in a random draw shuffle. The tribes swapped yet again on Day 15. The two tribes merged on Day 19 as the Osindile tribe.

Notes

Future appearances
Dino Paulo, Francois 'Chappies' Chapman, Noleen 'Pinty' Nkanjeni and Thoriso M-Afrika competed again in Survivor South Africa: Return of the Outcasts in 2022. Chappies placed 20th, Pinty placed 14th, Thoriso placed 13th and Dino won the season.

Season summary
The game began on home soil, with two tribes of 10, the green Zamba, and the orange Vuna. Both tribes saw solid majorities form over the first few days, until an early blindside left Chappies alienated by Vuna led by a majority formed around Anesu, Kiran, Tyson and Wardah. An early tribe swap to Zamba saw Chappies and Santoni aligned with Anela and the original Zamba to get revenge on Wardah's allies, until a second swap saw the Vuna trio of Kiran, Tyson, and Wardah take control over a weakening Zamba tribe in order to target Chappies at the merge.

The merge of the blue Osindile tribe saw alliances split between original tribal lines. While Anela and the Zamba alliance used a vote steal advantage against Chappies to have a vote majority, the Vuna trio decided to save Chappies with an idol to secure a numbers majority over the united Zamba alliance. The Vuna 6 continued to pick off the Zamba alliance, including during a Tied Destinies twist which saw the tribe partnered up with their fates tied for one round in the game. This left Anela and Nicole as the last remaining Zamba against a strong Vuna 6 lead by Kiran and Tyson.

The Vuna 6, however could not remain united as the core trio of Kiran, Tyson, and Wardah approached Anela and Nicole to target social threat, Anesu, and physical threat, Chappies. Chappies went on a record-tying immunity challenge winning streak to derail the dominant trio's plans. At Final 6, Anela attempted to formulate a blindside against the strategically dominant Kiran, but backed out at the last minute when he revealed his own plans to Kiran. The blunder left Anela stuck with switching allegiances over to Chappies and his challenge dominance as a shield to remain in the game. Eventually after numerous challenges, Nicole finally managed to beat Chappies in the Final Three Immunity Challenge, leading to her bringing her fellow Zamba ally to the Final Tribal Council.

The Final Tribal Council saw the jury urge Nicole to explain her quieter game throughout the season, despite her never-give-up attitude in challenges against the more-successful Chappies, while also trying to understand Anela's socially strong, yet strategically weak gameplay. The votes revealed that the jury felt they could understand her consistent and subtle gameplay over Anela's massive strategic blunders, awarding Nicole the victory and the title of Sole Survivor.  

In the case of multiple tribes or castaways who win reward or immunity, they are listed in order of finish, or alphabetically where it was a team effort; where one castaway won and invited others, the invitees are in brackets.
Notes

Episodes

Voting history

References

External links

2021 South African television seasons
Survivor South Africa seasons
Television productions postponed due to the COVID-19 pandemic
Television shows filmed in South Africa